The Green Christ (in French: Le Christ vert) is an oil on canvas painting executed by Paul Gauguin in the Autumn of 1889 in Pont-Aven, Brittany. Together with The Yellow Christ, it is considered to be one of the key-works of Symbolism in painting. It depicts a Breton woman at the foot of a calvary, or sculpture of Christ's crucifixion. Calvaries are common in town squares in Brittany. The woman appears to be hiding from a pair of figures in the distant background; the green Christ providing her cover from these people. 

Topographically, the site depicted is the Atlantic coast at Le Pouldu. But the calvary depicted is an amalgam of several calvaries from different places; the cross is based upon that in the centre of Névez, a community close to Pont-Aven, located several miles from the coast, and the figure of Christ is based upon the calvarie at Briec, also at some distance from the sea.

See also
List of paintings by Paul Gauguin

References

Christ
1889 paintings
Paintings of the Descent from the Cross
Paintings about death
Christian art about death
Collections of the Royal Museums of Fine Arts of Belgium
Paintings about sculpture